"Ov Fire and the Void" is a song by the extreme metal band Behemoth from their 2009 album Evangelion. The lyrics are inspired by Max Stirner's philosophy. When the first demo versions were recorded, Adarm "Nergal" Darski shared how he perceived the aural essence:

Music video

Recording and production 
The video for Ov Fire and the Void was filmed by Grupa 13 in Wrocław, Poland and was directed by Dariusz Szermanowicz. Both parties had previously worked on the video for At The Left Hand Ov God. Behemoth began working on the project in early July 2009 and they aimed to have its premiere in late July / early August, just preceding the release of Evangelion.

While filming the video in July, the band wanted to keep their fans informed by filming and posting behind the scene material.

On July 30 the trailer aired on YouTube, offering a glimpse into the theme of the video, followed by the premiere of the final video also on YouTube on August 6, just before the release of their album Evangelion which was released on August 7 in Europe.

Censorship 
On August 7, 2009, a day after the premiere of the video, the uncensored version of the video was removed from YouTube, causing a backlash from fans. The band uploaded a censored version of the video in response, and re-uploaded the original version to their Metal Blade page using Vimeo.

References

External links 
Ov Fire and the Void lyrics
Ov Fire and the Void music video on Metal Blade
Ov Fire and the Void music video on Vimeo in HD

Ov Fire and the Void MP3 download on Amazon.co.uk
Ov Fire and the Void MP3 download on Amazon.com

2009 songs
Behemoth (band) songs